Nalugu Stambhalata or Nalugu Sthambhalata may refer to
 Nalugu Stambhalata (film) - 1982 Telugu film.
 Nalugu Stambhalata (game) - A children game popular in Andhra Pradesh, India.